PDE-constrained optimization is a subset of mathematical optimization where at least one of the constraints may be expressed as a partial differential equation. Typical domains where these problems arise include aerodynamics, computational fluid dynamics, image segmentation, and inverse problems. Closed-form solutions are generally unavailable for PDE-constrained optimization problems, necessitating the development of numerical methods.

Applications 

 Aerodynamic shape optimization
 Drug delivery
 Mathematical finance

Optimal control of bacterial chemotaxis system 
The following example comes from p. 20-21 of Pearson. Chemotaxis is the movement of an organism in response to an external chemical stimulus. One problem of particular interest is in managing the spatial dynamics of bacteria that are subject to chemotaxis to achieve some desired result. This objective function is subject to the dynamics:where  is the Laplace operator.

See also 

 Multiphysics
 Shape optimization
 SU2 code

References

Further reading 

 Antil, Harbir; Kouri, Drew. P; Lacasse, Martin-D.; Ridzal, Denis (2018). Frontiers in PDE-Constrained Optimization. The IMA Volumes in Mathematics and its Applications, Springer. .
 Tröltzsch, Fredi (2010). Optimal Control of Partial Differential Equations: Theory, Methods, and Applications. Graduate Studies in Mathematics, American Mathematical Society. .

External links 

 A Brief Introduction to PDE Constrained Optimization
 PDE Constrained Optimization
 Optimal solvers for PDE-Constrained Optimization
 Model Problems in PDE-Constrained Optimization

Mathematical optimization
Optimal control
Partial differential equations